Myoporum mauritianum is a flowering plant in the figwort family Scrophulariaceae and is endemic to a few volcanic islands in the Indian Ocean. It is a small, low-branched shrub with serrated leaves and small white flowers and usually grows on calcarenite within  of the sea.

Description

The fruit is a yellow, roughly spherical drupe.

Taxonomy and naming
Myoporum mauritianum was first formally described by botanist Alphonse de Candolle in Prodromus Florae Novae Hollandiae in 1810. The specific epithet  mauitianum is the latinised form of Mauritius.

Distribution and habitat
Myoporum mauritianum occurs on the island of Rodrigues in the Republic of Mauritius where there are a few individual plants. Larger populations are found on a few smaller islands near Rodrigues but the species is thought to be extinct on Mauritius, where the type specimen was found.

Conservation
Myoporum mauritianum was listed as "endangered" on Rodrigues  and extinct on Mauritius in the 1997 IUCN Red List of Threatened Plants. It has not yet been assessed for the 2014-2015 version.

References

mauritianum
Endemic flora of the Mascarene Islands
Flora of Rodrigues
Plants described in 1810
Taxa named by Augustin Pyramus de Candolle
Flora of Mauritius